Dicitanaura or Dikitanaura was a town of ancient Pamphylia. It is mentioned under the name of Diciotanabron or Dikiotanabron in the Notitiae Episcopatuum.

Its site is unlocated.

References

Populated places in ancient Pamphylia
Former populated places in Turkey
Lost ancient cities and towns